"Big Gangsta" is a song by American rapper Kevin Gates, released on April 20, 2019, as the lead single from his second EP Only the Generals Gon Understand (2019). It was produced by Canadian producer Felix Leone. The song was a sleeper hit, peaking at number 81 on the Billboard Hot 100 in April 2021.

Composition and critical reception
Karlton Jahmal of HotNewHipHop describes the track as one which Kevin Gates "displays his penchant for clever bars and booming choruses". The instrumental features a "soft harp sounding synth and a booming bass", and Gates uses a "sing song flow" in the chorus.

Charts

Certifications

References

2019 singles
2019 songs
Kevin Gates songs